The Anti-Tank Mine, General Service, Mk V was a cylindrical, metal-cased United Kingdom anti-tank blast mine that entered service in 1943, during the Second World War. It was replaced in British service with the Mk 7 mine. Two versions of the mine were produced, the Mk. V and the Mk. VC with the same external dimensions. The only difference was that the Mk. VC had a half-sized explosive charge.

The mine used a spider pressure plate that makes it resistant to blast overpressure. The spider rests on a central Mk 3 fuse (sometimes referred to as No.3 Mk I), which contains a spring-loaded striker held in place by a shear pin. The mine, being made largely of steel tended to rust making its activation unpredictable.

It is found in Angola, Egypt, Jordan, Libya, Mozambique, Sudan, and Zimbabwe.

Variants
 Mine G.S. Mk VC (general service version)
 Mine G.S. Mk V

References
Citations

Bibliography

 Jane's Mines and Mine Clearance 2005-2006
 NAVORD OP 1665, British Explosive Ordnance, Naval Ordnance Systems Command (Updated 1970)

Anti-tank mines of the United Kingdom
World War II weapons of the United Kingdom